Prize4Life is a non-profit organization dedicated to the discovery of treatments and a cure for amyotrophic lateral sclerosis (ALS). The organization uses the inducement prize contest model. It was founded in 2007 by Avi Kremer, an Israeli student at Harvard Business School, who was diagnosed with ALS at the age of 29.

On February 3, 2011, Prize4Life announced the award of their first prize, the $1M ALS Biomarker Prize, to Dr. Seward Rutkove for his development of a tool to track the progression of the disease.

On November 1, 2018, Prize4Life in the United States announced they were shutting down and transferring their assets to the ALS Association. The Israeli nonprofit under the same name continues to operate.

References

Further reading 

 Venkataraman, Bina (2011-02-08). "$1Million to Inventor of Tracker for A.L.S". The New York Times
 Dance, Amber (2009-04-30). "News Brief: Scientists Net Prizes for Progress Toward ALS Biomarker". Alzheimer Research Forum. Retrieved 2009-05-11.
 Begley, Sharon (2008-10-21). "Help Mouse with Lou Gehrig's Disease. Win $1 Million". Newsweek Lab Notes. Retrieved 2009-05-11.
 Shnabel, Jim (2008-08-07. "Standard Model". Nature News. Retrieved 2009-05-11.
 Travis, John (2008-03-28). "Science by the Masses". Science Magazine. Retrieved 2009-05-11.
 Smith, Stephen (2007-05-28). "The Business of Survival". The Boston Globe. Retrieved 2009-05-11.
 Thayer, Ann (2006-11-15). "Big Biomarker Prize". Chemical and Engineering News. Retrieved 2009-05-11.
 Wessel, David (2006-06-23). "Using M.B.A. Drive To Speed an ALS Cure". College Journal. Retrieved 2009-05-11.

External links
 Prize4Life United States
 Prize4Life Israel

Challenge awards
Neurology organizations
Non-profit organizations based in Israel
Medical and health organizations based in Israel
Medical and health organizations based in California
Organizations based in Berkeley, California
Amyotrophic lateral sclerosis